Poon may refer to:
 The Calophyllum, also known as the "Poon Tree"
 Poon (surname), an East Asian surname
 Po-on (novel), a novel by Filipino author F. Sionil José
 Poon (county), a former county in Kwangtung (Guangdong), China

Other uses 
 A fool (Australian)
 several trees in the genus Calophyllum

See also
 Poona (disambiguation)

zh:潘姓